Maria la del Barrio is a Philippine remake of the Mexican telenovela of the same name, starring Erich Gonzales and Enchong Dee. The series premiered on ABS-CBN's Primetime Bida evening block and worldwide on The Filipino Channel from August 15, 2011 to March 2, 2012, replacing Mula sa Puso and was replaced by Wako Wako.

The series was streaming on YouTube.

Synopsis
Maria Hernandez (Erich Gonzales) is a charcoal maker who dreams of making furniture in her own shop, much like her mother Sandra (Assunta de Rossi), who died years ago in a fire leaving Maria orphaned. Maria grows up with Sandra's best friend Casilda (Ai-Ai de las Alas) in barrio Munting Ilog. When Casilda falls ill, Maria is forced to seek help from Father Honorio for added work. This leads her to meet Fernando de la Vega (Ian Veneracion), the owner of Amore Design, one of the country's top furniture companies. Fernando takes Maria to work for his family as a maid.

Unknown yet to Maria, Fernando was the former love of her mother Sandra. And that Fernando's wife Victoria (Angel Aquino), is Sandra's former friend and partner. Sandra and Victoria founded Amore designs, but Victoria double-crossed Sandra taking both her boyfriend and ownership of Amore. But before the fire, Sandra had bequeathed her shares to Maria, making Maria owner of 50% of Amore Designs.

Working for the De la Vegas leads Maria to meet, for the second time, Luis de la Vega (Enchong Dee), the eldest of the De la Vega children. Among those children are Vanessa (Jane Oineza) and Vladimir (Arron Villaflor). Maria had met and admired Luis before, seeing his work in Viscera, a small furniture shop. But Luis pays to her no mind. Worse, Luis, having had problems with his father Fernando, begins to suspect Maria to be Fernando's mistress. This through the suspicions of Soraya, his friend who is secretly in love with him. Luis makes Maria fall in love with him, with the intention of hurting Maria and making her leave.

Furthermore, he falls in love with Maria. And Maria, despite the pain, cannot help herself from loving Luis. But their love is put to the test by several trials. Such as, Soraya's attempt to break Luis apart from Maria, Sandra's comeback to ruin Victoria's life, lies that caused Maria's insanity which leads her into her wealthy transformation, and Sabrina who will do her best for her to keep Maria's daughter, Andrea. But an unfortunate disease will finally cause Soraya's life. Could this be Soraya's time to pay her sins to Maria?

Cast and characters

Protagonist
 Erich Gonzales as María Hernandez
 Enchong Dee as Luis Fernando M. Dela Vega

Lead cast
 Angel Aquino as Victoria Montenegro-Dela Vega
 Ian Veneracion as Fernando Dela Vega
 Assunta de Rossi as Sandra Hernandez

Main cast
 Jewel Mische as Sabrina Villabrille
 Paw Diaz as Soraya Montenegro
 Arron Villaflor as Vladimir M. Dela Vega
 Jake Roxas as David Decasa
 Jane Oineza as Vanessa M. Dela Vega
 Alyanna Angeles as Andrea "Andi" H. Dela Vega

Supporting cast
 K Brosas as Carlota
 Katya Santos as Cha-Cha
 Badjie Mortiz as Urbano
 Justin Gonzales as Pedro
 Atoy Co as Mang Doro
 Chiqui del Carmen as Lupe
 Peewee O'Hara as Berta
 Isay Alvarez as Calixta
 Gio Alvarez as Anot

Guest cast
 Rolando Inocencio as Padre Honorio
 Joed Serrano as Atty. Paul Parco
 Dionne Monsanto as Anna
 Fred Payawan as Kevin
 Frances Makil-Ignacio as Jessica
 Erika Padilla as Liz
 Maritess Joaquin as Marnette
 Manuel Chua as Roel
 Paul Jake Castillo as Gabe
 Joe Gruta as Kiko
 Rommel Velasquez as Atty. Santos
 Shey Bustamante as  Gret
 Helga Krapf as  Mia
 Noel Colet as Enrique Villabrille
 Johan Santos as Kent
 Niña Dolino as Bianca Lopez
 Boom Labrusca as Edwin Marasigan
 Archie Alemania as Nelson
 Cherry Lou as Christina Ruiz
 Regine Angeles as Lorrine Ruiz
 Luke Jickain as Alex
 Art Acuña as Attorney Fajardo
 Justin Cuyugan as Arturo
 Raul Montessa as Judge Sarmiento
 Gem Ramos as Hope
 Perla Bautista as Tita
 Lloyd Zaragoza as Arnold
 Ai-Ai de las Alas as Casilda Dimaculangan
 Christian Vasquez as Manuel Hernandez
 Dennis Padilla as Chito Cayanan
 Miles Ocampo as Sunshine Cayanan

Production
Production started in February 2011. The series was initially part of ABS-CBN's line-up of afternoon dramas, Kapamilya Gold, together with other television series; Nasaan Ka Elisa?, Mula Sa Puso, and Hiyas. However, teasers were released in July 2011, which stated that the show was to air on primetime. The series premiered on August 15, 2011 on Primetime Bida.

Last July 2016. ABS CBN revived the show by uploading Episode 1-145 on YouTube along with Hiyas, Lumayo Ka Man Sa Akin, Pintada, Nasaan Ka Elisa?, Paraiso and Angelito: Batang Ama.

Adaptation

María la del Barrio, originally aired on Televisa in 1995. It was the third telenovela in the trilogy of Maria, that starred Thalia. The show first aired in the Philippines through RPN in 1996, ABS-CBN in 1997-1998 and GMA Network in 2002-2003, dubbed in Filipino. After GMA Network's successful adaptations of Thalia's Marimar and Rosalinda, ABS-CBN decided to remake María la del Barrio.

Postponement, reshoots and recasts
There were speculations that the production had to reshoot several scenes because the network was not convinced with the outcome of the already-shot episodes. In addition, several characters were recast, including a lengthy casting process for the role of Vladimir de la Vega. Inno Martin was originally cast to play the role of Vladimir, but after several failed recastings, the role eventually ended up being played by Arron Villaflor. The role was first offered to Enrique Gil. However, Gil had to decline due to conflicting working schedules. Inno Martin's scenes as Vladimir prior to his replacement appeared in the show's first set of promos. When the show started production for the soon-to-be reshot episodes covering the first few months of the show, Martin was sacked with AJ Perez tapped to take-over the now-vacant role . But after Perez' untimely passing, Villaflor was brought in to take over the role of Vladimir. It finally premiered on August 15, 2011.

Reception

Ratings
After the winning 26.0% finale rating of previous time slot occupant Mula Sa Puso, Maria la del Barrio maintained the network's hold on the 6pm slot. The series debuted in fifth place with a 22.5% rating. The series aired its last episode on March 2 and earned fifth place in the ratings, garnering 20% of viewers.

Critical reception
On a review done by the Philippine Entertainment Portal, they quoted that "Erich looks tailor-made for the role; with her natural ability to summon naïve, childlike qualities with relative ease." They also stated that the scenes between the two lead actors provided the "'kilig' factor commonly sought by local viewers." The review concluded, "Erich has a wonderful opportunity to embrace the character as her own without having to live in the shadow of her famous Mexican predecessor."

Awards

See also
List of shows previously aired by ABS-CBN
María la del Barrio

References

External links

ABS-CBN drama series
Television series by Star Creatives
2011 Philippine television series debuts
2012 Philippine television series endings
Philippine television series based on telenovelas
Philippine romance television series
Philippine television series based on Mexican television series
Filipino-language television shows
Television shows set in the Philippines